Charles Sydnor may refer to:

 Charles S. Sydnor, (1898 - 1954) professor and author of American history
 Charles W. Sydnor, Jr., Holocaust and World War II historian
 Charles E. Sydnor III (born 1974), American politician in Maryland